Thomas Schertwitis (born 2 September 1972 in Alma-Ata, Kazak ASSR, Soviet Union) is a German water polo player who competed in the 2004 Summer Olympics and in the 2008 Summer Olympics.

References

1972 births
Living people
German male water polo players
Olympiacos Water Polo Club players
German people of Kazakhstani descent
Olympic water polo players of Germany
Water polo players at the 2004 Summer Olympics
Water polo players at the 2008 Summer Olympics
Asian Games medalists in water polo
Water polo players at the 1994 Asian Games
Asian Games gold medalists for Kazakhstan
Medalists at the 1994 Asian Games